Twisting the Jug is an album by saxophonist Gene Ammons with trumpeter Joe Newman and organist Jack McDuff recorded in 1961 and released on the Prestige label.

Reception
The Allmusic review stated: "Gene Ammons' 1961 session Twistin' the Jug features not only the powerhouse tenor playing at the top of his form, but a killer set of sidemen... this is a fun, listenable early soul-jazz session featuring two of the greats of the field".

Track listing 
All compositions by Gene Ammons, except where indicated.
 "Twistin' the Jug" – 4:40
 "Born to Be Blue" (Mel Tormé, Robert Wells) – 7:20
 "Satin Doll" (Duke Ellington, Johnny Mercer, Billy Strayhorn) – 6:46
 "Moten Swing" (Bennie Moten, Buster Moten) – 4:59
 "Stormy Monday" (Bob Crowder, Billy Eckstine, Earl Hines) – 8:42 
 "Down the Line" – 5:43

Personnel 
Gene Ammons – tenor saxophone
Joe Newman – trumpet
Jack McDuff – organ
Wendell Marshall – bass
Walter Perkins – drums
Ray Barretto – congas

References 

1961 albums
Prestige Records albums
Gene Ammons albums
Albums recorded at Van Gelder Studio